Velehrad is a municipality and village in Uherské Hradiště District in the Zlín Region of the Czech Republic. It has about 1,100 inhabitants. It is known as a pilgrimage site.

Geography
Most of the municipality lies in the Chřiby highlands. The built-up area lies in the valley of the stream Salaška.

History
The first written mention of Velingrad is from 1141. It was however the old name of neighbouring Staré Město, from which the name Velehrad was derived. In 1205, Margrave of Moravia Vladislaus III founded here a Cistercian monastery. The Romanesque monastery complex was finished in the first half of the 13th century.

After the monastery was abolished in 1784 by a decree of Emperor Joseph II, the people who worked in the monastery founded a municipality. The dilapidated monastery complex was gradually repaired in the mid-19th century. Since 1890 it has been managed by Society of Jesus. It became an important pilgrimage site with the annual participation of tens of thousands of pilgrims. In the 1990s it was visited twice by Pope John Paul II.

Sights

Velehrad is the most famous pilgrimage site in the Czech Republic. Sights include:
The Basilica of the Assumption of Mary and Saints Cyril and Methodius
The former Cistercian monastery
The Velehrad house of Saints Cyril and Methodius
Velehrad cemetery
The memorial stone called the "King's table" (Králův stůl)
Rosary Pilgrimage Route with Stations of the Cross
Columns and statues of St. John of Nepomuk, Jesus Christ and the Virgin Mary

Notable people
Otmar Oliva (born 1952), sculptor; lives and works here

References

External links

Villages in Uherské Hradiště District
Catholic pilgrimage sites